Grave Plott was a hardcore/horrorcore hip hop duo consisting of Killa C (born Coul Hill) and Liquid Assassin (born Cardell Avila Toombs, Jr.). Their only full-length album, The Plott Thickens, was released on May 20, 2008, through a Distribution deal  with Strange Music and Dirty Thug Records. The Plott Thickens charted #95 on the Billboard Top R&B/Hip-Hop Albums chart its first week out.
Grave Plott split up in 2008, and Killa C (Dirty Thug Recordz) and Liquid Assassin (42 Records) are doing solo albums.

Discography

Grave Plott

Killa C
Rivaz Ov Blood (2001)
Murdaeyez (2002)
Tainted Flesh: Thy Book Ov Death (2005)
Old Skewl Killa (2006)
Bound In Chains Book 2: Thy Book Ov Time (2009)
War Stories: Thy Book Ov Struggles (2011)
Coul Hill (2016)

Liquid Assassin
The Mixtape Vol. 1 (2007)
Apocalypse (2009)
The Lost Chapters of Apocalypse - EP (2009)
Cardell (2011)
Mongrel (2013)
Mulatto (2016)
Koba (2018)
Tsunami (2019)

References

External links
www.DirtyThug.com
https://www.facebook.com/pages/42-Records/216021005119944
https://web.archive.org/web/20051103041318/http://www.liquidassassin.com/

American hip hop groups
Musical groups established in 2005
Musical groups disestablished in 2008
Horrorcore groups